McFarlin is a surname. Notable people with the surname include:

Diane McFarlin, American journalist and newspaper publisher
Ivan McFarlin (born 1982), American basketball player
Robert J. McFarlin (1929-2017), American politician
Robert M. McFarlin (1866–1942), American businessman

See also
McFarlin Memorial Auditorium, theater in Texas, United States
McFarlin Building, historic building in Tulsa, Oklahoma